Elizabeth Montagu, Duchess of Manchester (c.1740 – 26 June 1832), formerly Elizabeth Dashwood, was the wife of George Montagu, 4th Duke of Manchester.

She was born at Kirtlington in Oxfordshire, a daughter of Sir James Dashwood, 2nd Baronet, and his wife, the former Elizabeth Spencer (whose sister Anne was Duchess of Hamilton). One of Elizabeth Dashwood's sisters, Anne, became Countess of Galloway.

She married Manchester on 22 or 23 October 1762, at St George's, Hanover Square, London, in the same year he inherited the dukedom. Their children were:

Lady Ana Maria Montagu, who died in childhood
George Montagu, Viscount Mandeville (1763–1772), who died in childhood and did not inherit his father's title
Caroline Maria Montagu (1770-1847), who married James Graham, 3rd Duke of Montrose, and had children
William Montagu, 5th Duke of Manchester (1771–1843)
Lord Frederick Montagu, MP (1774–1827)
Lady Emily Montagu (died 1838)

Sir Joshua Reynolds painted the duchess, along with her son George, Viscount Mandeville, in about 1766. The duchess was herself an amateur artist, whose pocket book is held by the Royal Academy of Arts in London.

The duke died in 1788, following which his widow received an annual pension of £3000, as officialcompensation for the loss of his income as Collector of Customs.

The dowager duchess died at her home in Berkeley Square, London, in 1832, in her 92nd year, and was buried at Kimbolton.

References

1740s births
1832 deaths
British duchesses by marriage
Daughters of baronets
People from Cherwell District